The Hamilton-Gordon executive council was 11th executive council of British Ceylon. The government was led by Governor Arthur Hamilton-Gordon.

Executive council members

See also
 Cabinet of Sri Lanka

References

1883 establishments in Ceylon
1890 disestablishments in Ceylon
Cabinets established in 1883
Cabinets disestablished in 1890
Ceylonese executive councils
Ministries of Queen Victoria